The Contemporary Art Museum (Macedonian: Музеј на современата уметност) is one of the largest and most complete national institutions of North Macedonia. Located in the capital city of Skopje, the museum was founded in 1963 following the disastrous earthquake that hit the city. The building project was donated by the Polish Government.

Collection
The collection is made up of two segments; international and national. The international segment of the collections reflects the modern art from almost all parts of the world. The larger part of the collection marks the art movements of the 1950s, 1960's and 1970s, although it contains also around a hundred works of the early modern art. The older exhibits are mainly highlighted by works of Emil Filla, Fernand Léger, and André Masson. The works of the internationally well-known artists are of special importance, such as Pablo Picasso, Hans Hartung, Victor Vasarely, Alexander Calder, Pierre Soulages, Alberto Burri, Christo, Tadeusz Kantor, Robert Jacobsen, Etienne Hajdu, Zoltan Kemeny, Jerzy Nowosielski, Robert Adams, Emilio Vedova, Jan Cybis, Antoni Clavé, and Georg Baselitz.

External links

 Official Website

References 

Macedonian art
Buildings and structures in Skopje
Museums in North Macedonia
Old Bazaar, Skopje